Pedro Gonçalves (born 1998) is a Portuguese footballer

Pedro Gonçalves may refer to:

 Pepe Gonçalves (born 1993), full name Pedro Henrique Gonçalves da Silva, Brazilian slalom canoeist
 Pedro Gonçalves (football manager) (born 1976), Portuguese football manager